Vanessa Kamga (born 19 November 1998) is a Swedish athlete specialising in the discus throw. She represented her country at the 2019 World Championships in Doha without reaching the final.

Her personal best in the event is 60.33 metres set in Norrköping in 2022.

International competitions

References

1998 births
Living people
Swedish female discus throwers
World Athletics Championships athletes for Sweden
Swedish sportspeople of African descent